Lycoming Career and Technology Center is a small suburban, public, career training center located in Hughesville, Pennsylvania. The School serves the residents of five local public school districts: East Lycoming School District, Loyalsock Township School District, Montoursville Area School District, Muncy School District and Warrior Run School District. Lycoming Career and Technology Center is located on the campus of Hughesville Junior Senior High School in the East Lycoming School District. Non-public school students who live in one of the five participating districts are able to attend the School. Lycoming Career and Technology Center is one of 80 public technology schools operating in Pennsylvania.

Lycoming Career and Technology Center offers a choice of three different attendance options. Students may enroll in one-year or two-year half-day programs. A third program offers Work Experience Programs. Students attend their home school for basic academics required for graduation, like literature, science, civics and math. Students graduate from their home district. Lycoming Career and Technology Center also offers evening and weekend adult continuing education programs.

Lycoming Career and Technology Center Joint Operating Co

Programs

Culinary Arts
Drafting & Design
Criminal Justice
Health Careers
Early Childhood Education
Automotive Tech
Computer Service Technology
Automotive Technology
Construction Technology

Students take the appropriate NOCTI exams offered by the National Occupational Competency Testing Institute. They can also participate in the annual SkillsUSA competitions.

References

Schools in Lycoming County, Pennsylvania
1998 establishments in Pennsylvania
Educational institutions established in 1998